Biela may refer to:

Biela, Bohemia, former name of a town in eastern Bohemia, now Luže
Biela, Greater Poland Voivodeship (west-central Poland)
Biela (river), a river in eastern Germany.
Wilhelm Freiherr von Biela, an Austrian military officer and amateur astronomer.
3D/Biela, a comet discovered by Wilhelm Freiherr von Biela.
Frank Biela, a German auto race driver.
Biela (crater), a lunar crater

See also 
 Biala (disambiguation)